Luch is a rural locality (a khutor) in Staropetrovsky Selsoviet, Birsky District, Bashkortostan, Russia. The population was 6 as of 2010. There are 2 streets.

Geography 
Luch is located 29 km south of Birsk (the district's administrative centre) by road. Starobiktimirovo is the nearest rural locality.

References 

Rural localities in Birsky District